Alexander Mikhailovich Bakunin ( – ) was a Russian diplomat, a prominent member of the Tver nobility, poet and publicist from the Bakunin family. The owner of the Pryamukhino estate, where he was visited by famous figures of Russian culture Vissarion Belinsky, Nikolai Stankevich, Timofey Granovsky and many others. He was also the father of the revolutionary socialist Mikhail Bakunin.

Biography

In 1781, Alexander Mikhailovich Bakunin, under the patronage of his uncle Peter Vasilyevich Bakunin ("the little one"), was sent to Piedmont, where he began serving as an actuary at the office of the Russian envoy in Turin. In Piedmont, he graduated from the Faculty of Natural History of the University of Turin.

In 1789, after graduating from the university, he defended his thesis on helminthology at the Faculty of Natural Philosophy and received his PhD. In July 1789, for his scientific merits, Alexander Mikhailovich Bakunin was elected a corresponding member of the Turin Royal Academy of Sciences.

In 1789, he served in Paris, where he observed the French Revolution with his own eyes, as he later wrote himself, "the bloody inconveniences of the transition of supreme power into the hands of people who have no other qualities than free-thinking." These impressions of youth for life made him a conservative and an opponent of any social upheaval. He adhered to conservative political views, in particular, according to people who knew him, he believed that "the feasible maintenance of power and existing laws is the path of every honest and enlightened person, and nationwide participation in governing the country is a dream inspired by the microscopic republics of Ancient Greece." However, at the same time, according to Vissarion Belinsky, who knew him, he was "one of those people blessed by God at birth, who will be born with everything that constitutes a higher spiritual person." Thanks to his personal, human qualities, he later managed to create an atmosphere in his estate Pryamukhino, permeated with love and poetry, and favorable for philosophical reflection and free-thinking.

Return to Pryamukhino
In March 1790, at the insistent request of his parents, he returned to Russia, on 14 July 1790, he resigned from the service, and on 31 March 1791, he retired with the rank of court councilor. For some time after his resignation, Alexander lived in St. Petersburg, where he was an active member of the literary circle of his longtime acquaintance (and by that time a relative) Nikolai Lvov. One of the members of this circle, the famous Russian poet Gavrila Derzhavin, noted that one of Alexanders' poems waas an example of an idyll.

In 1791, Alexander Bakunin settled in the family estate of Pryamukhino in the Novotorzhsky district of the Tver province. Here he became personally involved in the neglected economy of the estate.

In January 1797, after the accession to the throne of Emperor Paul I, Alexander Mikhailovich Bakunin was summoned to St. Petersburg. He was awarded the rank of Collegiate Councillor, and he was appointed  to serve as an advisor to the Gatchina city government organized by Paul I. Here he supervised the construction of a cascade of ponds in the Sylvia Park on the Kolpanka River, which was designed by Nikolai Lvov. However, on 14 November 1797, at the insistence of his mother, he again resigned in order to return and finally settle in Pryamukhino. In Pryamukhin, he was actively engaged in the restoration of its economy. At the very beginning of his economic reforms, he drew up a draft agreement with the peasants, which, according to his plan, was to be the basis for the reforms carried out in the economy. However, this project remained only a project. Most of the economic innovations conceived by him remained on paper. However, his energetic efforts nevertheless yielded results. For example, by 1804, the debt of his family was reduced by twenty thousand rubles, but his further marriage and the birth of his children did not allow him to do this, and even had to borrow again.

During this period, in his time that was free from economic concerns, he wrote a philosophical treatise, in the preface to which, based on an analysis of Russian history, he argued that the times of glory and power of Russia were always associated with the free position of its people, and that the "slavery" of its peasants, which at that time seemed natural and traditional to many, was a consequence of the greed of the grandees, unrestrained by the law.

At the same time, Alexander was actively involved in the construction of a new residential building in his estate. For the production of bricks, not far from Pryamukhin, there was a brick factory, the raw material for which was the clay deposits in the vicinity of Pryamukhin. Until 1810, two separate outbuildings were built, which were later combined into a single structure. In 1808, construction began on a new stone church, which was mostly completed by 1826. Alexander Bakunin was also involved in park construction in his estate, ennobling the estate park, which the Bakunins inherited from the former owners of the Shishkovs. It was Alexander who gave his park a picturesque and beautiful beauty, which was later admired by many of his guests, and which was called by Belinsky "Preukhin harmony". He arranged picturesque cascades of ponds in the park, which was facilitated by several springs available on the territory of the estate. He converted the old Riga into a Turkish bath. On the left bank of the Osuga River, he arranged several baths.

In 1806, Alexander Mikhailovich Bakunin was elected the Novotorzhsky district and Tver provincial leader of the nobility. After his marriage in 1810, he settled for a while in Tver, where Alexander Mikhailovich was a member of the salon of Grand Duchess Ekaterina Pavlovna. In this salon, he communicated with many famous people of his time, for example, with the famous Russian historian, historiographer and writer Nikolay Karamzin. In Tver Varvara Alexandrovna took piano lessons and drawing lessons from the famous painter Orest Kiprensky.

During the French invasion of Russia in 1812, Alexander Mikhailovich and his wife decided not to leave Pryamukhino. But the main concern of Bakunin and his wife was the upbringing of children. He himself was engaged in the education of his children: he taught them foreign languages, mathematics and other natural sciences, and Varvara Alexandrovna taught them music. In the house of Pravukhinsky there was a library, collected by Alexander Mikhailovich, so that his children had the opportunity to get acquainted with the works of the best representatives of world literature of that time. One of the main principles in the upbringing of children, Alexander Mikhailovich considered communication with nature, for which he arranged walks in the park and picturesque surroundings. In November 1834, the Bakunin family for the first time in full force left for the winter to live in Tver.

Presumably, he played an important role (with his advice to Mikhail Muravyov) when the Union of Salvation was reorganized into the Union of Prosperity in 1818. He also became a member of the Secret Society of the North, wishing to institute a constitutional monarchy. After the failed Decembrist revolt of 1825 he gave up on emancipating the serfs and devoted himself entirely to the management of his estate and the education of his children, according to the precepts of Jean-Jacques Rousseau.

During the 1830s and 40s, at the invitation of Alexander Mikhailovich, Pryamukhino was visited by many prominent representatives of Russian society of that time - young philosophers, writers and scientists. For example, the famous Russian writer Ivan Lazhechnikov, director of the men's gymnasium in Tver, where the sons of the Bakunins studied, after visiting the Pryamukhin, wrote about the Bakunins' estate in the best of terms. From the beginning of the 1830s, Alexander Mikhailovich Bakunin was the trustee of the Tver gymnasium.

From the mid-1830s, Alexander Mikhailovich Bakunin began to go blind and by 1845 he was completely blind. Due to illness, he could no longer do household chores. In 1842, his son Nikolai came to the estate after retirement, and he took over all the household chores. At the end of March 1852, Alexander Mikhailovich fell seriously ill, and on 6 December 1854, he died. He was buried in the family tomb under the altar of the church in Pryamukhino.

Family
In 1810, Alexander Bakunin fell in love with eighteen-year-old Varvara Alexandrovna Muravyova (1792-1864), the only daughter of Alexander Fedorovich Muravyov (d. 1792) and Varvara Mikhailovna Mordvinova (1762-1842). She was 24 years younger than her husband and before marriage she lived in the estate of her stepfather - Pavel Markovich Poltoratsky, a relative of the Bakunins, in Bakhovkino, 30 kilometers from Pryamukhin. According to the family legend, Varvara Aleksandrovna was in love with her cousin A.N. Muravyov, who taught her, among other things, to fence and to dance the cachucha. At first, due to the age difference, she refused Bakunin her hand. Not counting on the success of the matchmaking anymore, Alexander Mikhailovich was going to commit suicide, but his sister Tatyana immediately let Varvara Alexandrovna know about it. She was horrified and decided to become the philosopher's wife. He loved and knew only her all his life. The engagement took place on 3 June 1810, and on 16 October, a wedding followed in the Pryamukha house church. The family had five daughters and six sons:

Lyubov (1811-1838), was the bride of Nikolai Stankevich, died of consumption.
Varvara (1812-1866), since 1835 - the wife of Lieutenant Nikolai Nikolaevich Dyakov (1812-1852), from 1838 to 1843 lived separately from her husband abroad, was in love with NV Stankevich.
Mikhail (1814-1876), theorist of anarchism, was married to Anastasia Ksaveryevna Kvyatovskaya.
 (1815-1871), single, Vissarion Belinsky's acquaintance, a poem by Ivan Turgenev is dedicated to her.
Alexandra (1816-1882), Vissarion Belinsky was infatuated with her, V.P. Botkin wooed her, since 1844 the wife of Gabriel Petrovich Wulf (1807-1861).
Nikolai (1818-1901), staff captain, in his first marriage was married to Anna Petrovna Ushakova, in the second to Sofya Alekseevna Sokolova.
Ilya (1819-1900), was married to Elizaveta Albertovna Schlippenbach.
 (1820-1900), philosopher, author of several works, from 1889 he lived in the Crimea. Since 1861 he was married to his second cousin Natalya Semyonovna Karsakova (1827-1915).
 (1821-1908), lieutenant, in his first marriage was married to Elizaveta Vasilievna Markova-Vinogradskaya, in the second to Elizaveta Alexandrovna Lvova (1853-1926).
 (1823-1882), Novotorzhsky district leader of the nobility, musician, botanist. Since 1876 he was married to Maria Nikolaevna Mordvinova (1854-1923), the granddaughter of Idalia Poletika.
Sophia (1824 - 05/30/1826), baptized on 28 September 1824, in the Pryamukhino Church of the Intercession, goddaughter of Anna Mikhailovna Bakunina; died of dysentery, was buried in the family tomb.

Notes

References

Bibliography
 
 

1768 births
1854 deaths
Russian poets
Russian untitled nobility
Russian diplomats